Otomo is a German film about racism directed by Frieder Schlaich, distributed by ArtMattan productions, and was released in 1999.

Actor Isaach de Bankole plays Frederic Otomo, and actress Eva Mattes, Gisela, the woman who tries to help him.

Otomo was the winner of numerous awards, including the Diversity in Spirit Award, Vancouver 2000, Best Film, Belgamo 2000, Best Actress, Valinciennes 2000 and a Kino Award.

Critical reviews 
The film received generally positive reviews from Western critics. The review aggregator Rotten Tomatoes reported that 100% of critics gave the film positive reviews based on 10 reviews. While Metacritic reported that the film had an average score of 60 out of 100, based on 8 critic reviews.

Plot 
The journey begins with Frederic Otomo departing from his home, early one morning, to get a job at a factory in Germany. There, he is refused employment from a cast of all Caucasian workers, predicated upon the claim that his shoes are not proper for the work. Later, he departs for home on a train, disappointed, to be kicked off of the train by a ticket inspector who claims that his ticket has expired. Suddenly, Otomo becomes a fugitive when the ticket inspector refuses to let him off of the train, and instead, tries to have him arrested. Fleeing, he later encounters a grandmother who attempts to help him escape Stuttgart, to Amsterdam. He kisses her then leaves, and is finally caught by police officers, while he is waiting for her on a bridge. Left no choice but to defend himself, Otomo, in desperation, stabs the five officers, and one of them shoots him dead.

Background 
The movie is a fictionalized account of an event that occurred on 8 August 1989 in Stuttgart. Frederic Otomo, a Cameroonian who also used the name of Albert Ament from Liberia, fatally stabbed police officers Harald Poppe and Peter Quast with a bayonet hidden in a rolled-up newspaper and wounded three other police officers before being fatally shot by one of the officers. See :de:Polizistenmord auf der Gaisburger Brücke

References

External links
 

1999 films
1999 drama films
German drama films
1990s German-language films
Films about illegal immigration to Europe
Films about race and ethnicity
1990s German films